Fruitport High School is a public high school in Fruitport, Michigan, United States. It is part of the Fruitport Community Schools district.

History 
A new wing on campus being built in 2019 has structures to make it more difficult for mass shooters to harm students and staff. Defences include curved hallways, projecting barriers, wirelessly locking doors, reinforced glass, an "educational Panopticon", and other protective features.

Academics 
Fruitport was ranked 257th in Michigan in the 2019 U.S. News & World Report best high school rankings.

Athletics 
The Fruitport Trojans compete in the Ottawa-Kent Conference. The school colors are navy blue and white. The following Michigan High School Athletic Association (MHSAA) sanctioned sports are offered:

 Baseball (boys)
 Basketball (boys and girls)
 Bowling (boys and girls)
 Competitive cheer (girls)
 Cross country (boys and girls)
 Football (boys)
 Golf (boys and girls)
 Ice hockey (boys)
 Lacrosse (boys and girls)
 Soccer (boys and girls)
 Softball (girls)
 Tennis (boys and girls)
 Track and field (boys and girls)
 Volleyball (boys and girls)
 State champion - 2005, 2010, 2011
 Wrestling (boys)

Notable alumni 
 Mike Teeter, NFL player

References

External links 
 

Schools in Muskegon County, Michigan
Public high schools in Michigan